WMF may refer to:

Organisations
 Wikimedia Foundation, a non-profit foundation that supports the Wikimedia movement projects, including Wikipedia
 , a Namibian armoured vehicle producer
 Women and Memory Forum, a women's rights organisation based in Egypt
 World Minifootball Federation, an authority of minifootball
 World Minigolfsport Federation, a federation of miniature golf associations
 World Monuments Fund, an international historic preservation organization
 WMF Group, a German tableware manufacturer

Computing
 Windows Metafile, an image file format originally designed for Microsoft Windows
 Windows Media Foundation